The women's high jump event at the 1975 Pan American Games was held in Mexico City on 17 October.

Results

References

Athletics at the 1975 Pan American Games
1975